SCOsource is a business division of The SCO Group that managed its (now legally voided) Unix intellectual property. The term SCOsource is often used for SCO's licensing program that allowed corporate users of Linux to buy licenses to proprietary Unix technology that SCO claimed exists in the Linux operating system. A single CPU license costs $699 (USD).

On July 21, 2003, SCO announced that it intended to sell binary-only licences to use the free Linux operating system which would remove the threat of litigation from licence-holders. Linux advocates reacted by stating that SCO had no basis for this action, as their claims were still disputed in court, and that the terms of the GPL seemed to indicate that doing this may cause SCO to forfeit their rights to distribute Linux or Linux-derived code in any form.

EV1Servers.net
On March 1, 2004, SCO announced it had reached a license agreement with EV1Servers.net, which allowed EV1Servers to use some of SCO's "intellectual property". SCO's Blake Stowell claimed the deal was worth upward of "seven figures" ($1,000,000) while a few days later EV1Servers CEO Robert Marsh claimed the amount was much lower. The exact amount was required to remain secret under terms of the agreement.

Computer Associates
During discovery of the SCO v. IBM case, SCO attorney Mark J. Heise wrote a letter answering some questions raised by IBM's attorneys. In this letter, sent on February 4, 2004 and published on Groklaw on February 10, 2004, Heise revealed that Computer Associates bought a Linux intellectual property license from SCO. On March 4, 2004 Computerweekly.com published an extensive article in which SCO CFO Robert Bench confirmed this. Computer Associates later denied buying licenses from SCO :

CA senior VP of product development Mark Barrenechea says that Bench's claim is nonsense. CA has not paid SCO any Linux taxes, he said. Drawing up short of calling SCO a liar, Barrenechea claims that SCO has twisted a $40 million breach-of-contract settlement that CA paid last summer to the Canopy Group, SCO's biggest stockholder, and Center 7, another Canopy company, and has turned it into a purported Linux license.

As a 'small part' of that settlement, Barrenechea said, CA got a bunch of UnixWare licenses that it needed to support its UnixWare customers. SCO, he said, had just attached a transparent Linux indemnification to all UnixWare licenses and that is how SCO comes off calling CA a Linux licensee.

See also
SCO–Linux disputes
Groklaw

External links
 Groklaw – An online community dedicated to following the progress of the various lawsuits and investigating the claims SCO makes

SCO–Linux disputes